Contact centre may refer to:

 Contact centre, an extension of a call centre
 Child contact centre, a centre for children to maintain contact with an absent parent

See also
 Contact center telephony